Addison Davis James (February 27, 1849 – June 7, 1910) was a United States representative from Kentucky. He was born near Morgantown, Kentucky. He  attended the public schools and began the study of medicine in 1870. He graduated from the University of Louisville, Louisville, Kentucky, in 1873.

Addison was a member of the Kentucky constitutional convention in 1890 and a member of the Kentucky House of Representatives 1891-1893. He also served as a commissioner to the World's Fair at Chicago representing the State of Kentucky in 1892 and 1893. In addition, he was a member of the Kentucky Senate in 1895 and appointed United States marshal for the district of Kentucky on July 6, 1897, and reappointed on December 17, 1901, and served until December 31, 1905.

Addison was elected as a Republican to the Sixtieth Congress (March 4, 1907 – March 3, 1909) but was an unsuccessful candidate for reelection. After leaving Congress, he resumed the practice of medicine. He died in Penrod, Kentucky, in 1910 and was buried in a cemetery on the family estate.

References

Addison Davis James at The Political Graveyard

1849 births
1910 deaths
Republican Party Kentucky state senators
Republican Party members of the Kentucky House of Representatives
University of Louisville School of Medicine alumni
United States Marshals
Republican Party members of the United States House of Representatives from Kentucky
People from Butler County, Kentucky